Christopher Eugene Mabeus (born February 11, 1979) is an American former Major League Baseball pitcher. He played one game at the major league level for the Milwaukee Brewers.

He grew up in Soldotna, Alaska and attended Soldotna High School where he played baseball and water polo. He told reporters he was recruited by more colleges to play water polo than college baseball. He played college baseball at Eastern Arizona College in Thatcher, Arizona and Lewis-Clark State College in Lewiston, Idaho.

Mabeus was drafted by the Oakland Athletics in the 13th round of the 2001 amateur draft.

References

External links

1979 births
Living people
Baseball players from Alaska
Milwaukee Brewers players
Major League Baseball pitchers
Nashville Sounds players
Lewis–Clark State Warriors baseball players
American expatriate baseball players in Canada
Huntsville Stars players
Mesa Desert Dogs players
Midland RockHounds players
Modesto A's players
Sacramento River Cats players
Vancouver Canadians players
People from Soldotna, Alaska